Albert Stark may refer to:

Albert P. Stark, Justice of the Montana Supreme Court
Albert Stark (basketball), coach of the Dartmouth Big Green men's basketball team from 1928 to 1936